Christiaan Hendrik Muller (Chris, "Ou Raaltjie", January 4, 1865 – January 14, 1945) was a Boer general during the Anglo-Boer War (1899-1902). He succeeded General Ben Viljoen as the sole leader of the Boer forces in the Eastern Transvaal after Viljoen was captured by British troops on 25 January 1902 and sent to St. Helena as a prisoner of war.

Biography 
Muller was born in the Cape Colony, South Africa, but grew up in the Orange Free State and later in Transvaal of the South African Republic where he fought in military campaigns against natives. In the Anglo-Boer War (1899-1902) he initially was a corporal in the Boksburg command, but later on he was promoted to general in virtue of his excellent weapon skills.

With General Ben Viljoen Muller led the Boers in the Battle of Helvetia on 29 December 1900, 10 km north of Machadodorp. They won a surprise victory over the British forces of Major Stapleton Lynch Cotton (1860-1928), attacking them at night from east and west. The Boers numbered about 580 men, while the British forces were only about 350 men strong, however boasting a 120mm (4.7 inch) naval cannon. Taking 235 prisoners of war, Muller later became particularly famous for the capture of this cannon, jokingly called the 'Lady Roberts'. On 12 June 1901 Muller and his troops overpowered about 350 men of the Australian 5th Victorian Mounted Rifles at Wilmansrust, Transvaal seizing ammunition, pom-pom guns, clothing and food, much needed by the Boers at that point.

He joined in the peace negotiations leading to the Treaty of Vereeniging in 1902 concluding the Anglo-Boer War. After the war, Muller was the director of the South African Landbank founded in 1912. In 1914 he was involved in the Maritz Rebellion but also was a member of the Parliament of South Africa for a number of years.

Muller died in 1945 in Johannesburg.

Bibliography 
 Muller, Christiaan H.: Oorlogsherinneringe van generaal Chris. H. Muller, Nasionale Pers, Kaapstad 1936. In Afrikaans.
 Rosenthal, Eric (Ed.): Ensiklopedie van Suidelike Afrika, Frederick Warne, London, 1967. In Afrikaans.

External links 
 . In March 1902 General Muller encouraged the mining of alluvial gold by the Boer Johannesburg Commando to mint gold coins, called veldpond, field pound.

References

Boer generals
People of the Second Boer War
1865 births
1945 deaths